Municipalidad is a Spanish term for municipality used in many Latin American countries such as Argentina, Chile, Costa Rica, Ecuador, Guatemala, Colombia, Paraguay, Peru , the 
Philippines, and Puerto Rico. It refers to the governing body of a particular territory and not to the territory, which is often referred to as "municipio"

In Chile the territory governed is called a "comuna", which is the third-level administrative division of the country.

See also
Ayuntamiento
Comuna
Municipio

References

External links
 Documental sobre desarrollo rural municipal en Costa Rica

Types of administrative division
Spanish words and phrases